Tier 4 or Tier four may refer to:

Tier 4 COVID restrictions in England under The Health Protection (Coronavirus, Restrictions) (All Tiers) (England) Regulations 2020, the highest level
Level 4 COVID restrictions, in COVID-19 pandemic in Scotland
Tier-4 COVID restrictions, in COVID-19 pandemic in Wales
Tier IV, a data center standard
Tier 4 in United States vehicle emission standards

See also
Multitier architecture
WTA Tier IV tournaments, Women's Tennis Association tennis second-level tournaments
Tier 1 (disambiguation)
Tier 2 (disambiguation)
Tier 3 (disambiguation)
Tirefour Castle, in Scotland